Fabriciano “Fabri” Salcedo (May 28, 1914 in Santander, Cantabria, Spain – August 25, 1985 in Rochelle Park, New Jersey) was a U.S. soccer forward.  Salcedo spent thirteen seasons in the American Soccer League, leading the league in scoring three of those seasons, one season in the St. Louis Soccer League and part of one season in the National Soccer League of Chicago.  He is a member of the National Soccer Hall of Fame.

Early career
Salcedo was born in Spain and played with several youth teams before moving to the United States in May 1929.  He played with a string of amateur clubs playing in city leagues, including Segura F.C. (Metropolitan League of New York City), Madrid F.C. and Portuguese Victoria F.C. (Westchester County League).  When Portuguese Victoria won the 1934 league title, Salcedo came to the attention of Duncan Othen, coach of the American Soccer League club Brooklyn Hispano.

Brooklyn Hispano
In 1934, Salcedo signed with Hispano and would play most of his career with the Brooklyn team, beginning as a center forward before moving to right forward.  While with Hispano, Salcedo would play with Walter Bahr, another great American player.  In his first season, Salcedo scored eleven goals, putting him sixth on the league's scoring list.  This led to his selection to the U.S. national team for an unofficial game with Scotland on May 19, 1935.  In 1937, Hispano went to the ASL title game, only to fall to the Kearny Scots.

Chicago
On September 9, 1938, Chicago Manhattan Beer purchased Salcedo's contract for $500.  In Chicago, he joined Billy Gonsalves, a future Hall of Famer.  In the 1938–1939 season, Manhattan Beer played in the St. Louis Soccer League which had invited several Chicago teams to join the league.  Manhattan finished second in the league standings.  The team also went to the National Challenge Cup final before falling to Brooklyn St. Mary's Celtic.

In September 1939, Salcedo signed with the Kearny Scots (ASL).  He played one game, against Hispano.  However, Hispano disputed Salcedo's signing with the Scots, claiming they still owned his rights in the ASL.  The US Football Association agreed with Hispano and nullified Salcedo's contract with the Scots.  Salcedo returned to Manhattan Beer for the start of the 1939-1940 St. Louis Soccer League season.  However, he then jumped to the Danish-Americans of the National Soccer League of Chicago.  He played only briefly with the Danish-Americans before moving back east to sign with Hispano.

Brooklyn Hispano
Beginning in 1939, Salcedo would play the next eight seasons with Hispano.  While Salcedo is best known for his goal scoring exploits, he did play part of one game in the fall of 1941 in goal.  That season, he dropped to ninth in the end of year goals list after missing part of the season with a leg injury.  Hispano won its only league title in 1942–1943.  It also took the National Challenge Cup giving Salcedo and his teammates a “double”.  Hispano repeated as National Cup champions the next year.  At the start of the 1947–1948 season, Hispano released Salcedo and he signed with the Philadelphia Americans.  That season, Salcedo won his last championship as the Americans took the ASL title.

Non-soccer career
The low salaries paid by soccer teams during this era was not enough to live on.  Consequently, Salcedo and his teammates had non-playing jobs in addition to their soccer careers.  Salcedo worked a variety of manual labor jobs.  When he moved to Chicago Manhattan Beer in 1938, he worked in the Manhattan Beer brewery.  After returning to Brooklyn in 1939, he was hired by Federal Shipyard and Drydock where he became a machinist in 1940.  In 1946, he left Federal to join the Engineering & Research Division of the ITT Continental Baking Company.  He retired in 1979.

He was married with two children, a daughter, Diane, and a son, Hank who married Eileen Mandeville of Oradell NJ. Who gave birth to Craig Mandeville, Cindy Mandeville, Elaine Mandeville, Tom Salcedo and Steve Salcedo.

He was posthumously inducted into the National Soccer Hall of Fame in 2005.

Honors
League titles
1943, 1948

National Cup titles
1943, 1944

Leading goal scorer
1937–1938, 1940–1941, 1945–1946

External links
 Biography
 Book

1914 births
1985 deaths
Spanish footballers
Footballers from Santander, Spain
Spanish emigrants to the United States
American Soccer League (1933–1983) players
Brooklyn Hispano players
Kearny Scots players
National Soccer League (Chicago) players
Chicago Manhattan Beer players
St. Louis Soccer League players
National Soccer Hall of Fame members
People from Rochelle Park, New Jersey
Association football forwards
American soccer players